Teimuraz Otarovich Ramishvili (born 4 May 1955 in Moscow, Russian SFSR), is a Russian diplomat of Georgian origin, the Russian Ambassador to South Korea in 2000-2005, Ambassador Extraordinary and Plenipotentiary, Ambassador to Denmark from 2008. He has been the Ambassador of Russia to Norway since 2016.

Early life
 Graduated from the Moscow State Institute of International Relations in 1979.

Political activity
 In 1992-2000 Director of the Department for Humanitarian Cooperation and Human Rights of the Russian Ministry of Foreign Affairs, Russia.
 2000—2005 – Ambassador of Russia to South Korea.
 2005—2007 - Ambassador at Large, Ministry of Foreign Affairs, Russia.
 2007—2012 – Ambassador of Russia to Denmark.
 2012—2016 - Director of the Department of Linguistic Support of the Russian Ministry of Foreign Affairs. 
 Since 2016 – Ambassador of Russia to Norway.

International conferences activity
 Participated in many international conferences on humanitarian cooperation and human rights  issues.

References 

1955 births
Living people
Moscow State Institute of International Relations alumni
Soviet diplomats
Ambassador Extraordinary and Plenipotentiary (Russian Federation)
Ambassadors of Russia to Denmark
Ambassadors of Russia to Norway
Ambassadors of Russia to South Korea